Duncan v. Kahanamoku, 327 U.S. 304 (1946), was a decision by the United States Supreme Court. It is often associated with the Japanese exclusion cases (Hirabayashi v. United States, Korematsu v. United States and Ex parte Endo) because it involved wartime curtailment of fundamental civil liberties under the aegis of military authority, though in this case neither the plaintiff nor the nominal defendant were Japanese.

While Duke Kahanamoku was a military police officer during World War II, he arrested Lloyd C. Duncan, a civilian shipfitter on February 24, 1944, after Duncan's brawl with two armed Marine sentries at the yard. At the time, Hawaii was not yet a state and was administered under the Hawaiian Organic Act, which effectively instituted martial law on the island and was tightened after the attack on Pearl Harbor.

Duncan was tried and convicted by a military tribunal for assault on military or naval personnel with intent to resist or hinder them in the discharge of their duty. However, civilian courts had restarted summoning jurors and witnesses and conducting criminal trials on the island.

Duncan appealed to the Supreme Court, which ruled that his trial by military tribunal was unconstitutional.

See also
List of United States Supreme Court cases, volume 327

References

Further reading

External links

United States Supreme Court cases
United States Supreme Court cases of the Stone Court
Legal history of Hawaii
1946 in United States case law